Since 1914, Greece (or the Hellenic Republic) has had mandatory military service (conscription) of 12 months in the Army, Navy and the Air Force for men between the age of 16 to 45. Citizens discharged from active service are normally placed in the Reserve and are subject to periodic recall of 1–10 days at irregular intervals.

Duration
Universal conscription was introduced in Greece during the military reforms of 1909, although various forms of selective draft had been in place earlier. In more recent years, conscription was associated with the state of general mobilisation declared on July 20, 1974 due to the Turkish invasion of Cyprus (the mobilisation was formally ended on December 18, 2002).

The length of a tour has varied historically, between 12–36 months depending on various factors particular to the conscript, and the political situation. Although women are accepted into the Greek army on a voluntary basis, they are not required to enlist, as men are. Soldiers receive no health insurance, but they are provided medical support during their army service, including hospitalization costs.

Between 2009 and 2021, Greece had a mandatory military service of 9 months for the Army and 12 months for the Navy and the Air Force. This applied to citizens between the ages of 19 and 45. However, as the Armed forces had been gearing towards a complete professional army system, the government had promised that the mandatory military service would be cut to 6 months by 2008 or even abolished completely. However, this did not occur due to severe manpower shortages. These were caused by a combination of (a) financial difficulties, which meant that professional soldiers could not be hired at the projected rate, and (b) widespread abuse of the deferment process, which meant that 66% of the draftees deferred service in 2005. The number of conscripts affected to the Navy and the Air Force was greatly reduced, with an aim towards full professionalisation.

As of May 2021, mandatory military service in the Hellenic Army was once again raised to 12 months for all males aged 19–45, unless serving in units in Evros or the North Aegean islands where duration was kept at 9 months. 

Greek males between the age of 18 and 60 who live in strategically sensitive areas may be required to serve part-time in the National Guard (Ethnofylaki Greek: Εθνοφυλακή). Service in the Guard is paid.

In 1998, the Greek Parliament voted law 2641 which mandated enrollment of Greek men and women between 18 and 60 years of age into a Civil Defence Organisation (Palaiki Amina Greek: Παλλαϊκή Άμυνα, ΠΑΜ). It was envisaged that the Civil Defence Organisation would respond to enemy action, natural disasters and all sorts of emergencies, but the law was never enforced.

Reserve officers

Reserve Officers (ROs) are selected among draftees with sufficient educational and physical qualifications. Educational qualifications include possessing a secondary education Lykeion diploma, while physical qualifications are determined in a series of standardized athletic tests. In practice, almost all draftees in possession of a Lykeion diploma will have an YEA (Υποψήφιος Έφεδρος Αξιωματικός, YEA, Reserve Officer Cadet) indication on their conscription invitation, although serving as a reserve officer is not mandatory. Draftees without a university diploma can decline the offer, while university graduates, who are obliged to undergo physical as well as psychological tests, may lawfully try not to pass those tests. Those who finally choose and pass all the physical and psycho-attitudinal tests necessary to be accepted as Reserve Officer cadets, are first sent for a longer (compared to soldiers' and NCOs') training period in one of the Reserve Officer cadet schools, typically for 16 weeks, after which they are nominated ΔΕΑ (Δόκιμος Έφεδρος Αξιωματικός, DEA, Probationary Reserve Officer, PRO).

Service as a PRO is different from a simple conscript's in many ways: PROs are generally subject to a harder training at first as cadets, but are also offered many privileges such as better dwellings, infrastructures and education. After their graduation from cadet academies, PROs are not required to live in barracks but can reside outside the camp and follow the same work schedule of commissioned officers, and even receive a salary equal to 60% of a commissioned sublieutenant (ca. 800 euros) plus certain bonuses depending on social and service criteria.

However, after the reduction of the tour's duration from 18 to 12 months in 2003, and from 12 to 9 in 2009, there is less incentive to become a PRO, as PROs were always required to serve 5 extra months compared to soldiers and NCO conscripts. In times where the tour duration was longer (18 months or more), the perceived difference in serving time was not as great as with shorter tours, while with shorter tours many conscripts just choose to get over with it as soon as possible.

Reduced tour
Conscripts may serve a reduced tour for various reasons. Some common categories of conscripts serving reduced tours are:
 Citizens who have been living constantly abroad since their eleventh birthday and whose parents are not employed by the Greek state are required to serve three months.
 Citizens who moved to Greece before their eleventh birthday from Albania, Turkey or countries of the former Soviet Union (except Estonia, Latvia, Lithuania). These conscripts are required to serve three months.
 Scientists involved in outstanding research may serve three to six months, but are required to buy off the remaining duration of the normal tour (24 months) at 293,47 euros per month not served. These conscripts may fulfill their military obligations in disjointed tours of two months.
 All brothers of large families (4 children or more) serve for six months. 
 Citizens whose income is required to support family members (such as children, elderly parents or younger siblings) usually serve an eight-month tour. In most cases this only applies to the oldest male members of the family who are capable of generating income.
The first son in a family where the father is past the age of 70 or has died serve an 8-month tour.

Permanent deferment
The following categories of citizens are not required to serve in the armed forces of Greece:
 Women;
 People with serious health problems, including the mentally ill;
 Fathers of three or more children;
 The eldest sons in families, whose members cannot support themselves;
 Fathers whose wives have died or are incapable of work and whose children cannot support themselves;
 Foreigners living in the monastic community of Mount Athos.

Conscientious objectors
In 1997, the Greek parliament voted a law that established alternative and unarmed service for conscientious objectors and in 2001, amended the Constitution to recognise the right to conscientious objection. As of 2004, alternative service is twice as long as the military service minus a month, i.e. 23 months, and unarmed service is 1.5 times as long as the military service, i.e. 18 months. Men serving alternative service at an institution that cannot provide them with food and accommodation receive a living expenses stipend about 210 euros per month.
Since the reduction of the full service to 9 months, the alternative service is 17 months and unarmed service lasts 13 and 1/2 months. The ministry had stated that after the changes in the army-due to the reduction of the service-will be seen practically and the new structure functions, then will be made a new plan for a reduction of the term to 6 months (and so to 11 months for the alternative and to 9 months for the unarmed service.

Many of those who apply for alternative service are refused. The committee that judges them is under the power of the Ministry of Defence, and includes members of the military, contrary to international standards..

Draft evaders and citizens living abroad
Draft evaders living in Greece are not allowed to leave the country. Prior to 2002, the passports of draft evaders living outside Greece were not renewed after the expiration of the original. Upon re-entering Greece, these people were generally forced to conscribe. However, in 2002, the right was granted to all Greek citizens to be issued passports, regardless of their draft status. In 2004, partial amnesty was granted to draft evaders, allowing them to visit Greece for up to 30 days in a single calendar year.

Greek military law allows Permanent Residents Abroad to defer military service until repatriation to Greece. Until 2005, Permanent Residents Abroad status (for draft purposes) was only granted to persons who had been born abroad or who had moved abroad before the age of eleven and to those who had immigrated to a specific set of countries before 1997. This definition excluded many thousands of citizens who were living abroad and who were regarded as 'draft evaders' by the authorities. The law was amended at the end of 2005 to grant Permanent Resident Abroad status to persons who have lived abroad for at least eleven years, or have worked abroad for at least seven years.

Aspects of military life

Training
Military training in the Hellenic Army consists of three cycles. The first cycle includes Basic (lasting 6 weeks) and Specialist Training (lasting 3–7 weeks). Basic and Specialist training take place in dedicated training facilities. The second training cycle is conducted in combat units, and lasts for 6 months. The third phase of training comprises the remainder of a conscript's tour and also carried out in regular army units.

According to current standing orders, conscripts are required to train for a total of 7½ hours daily. However, a large number of conscripts are excused from training as they are on secondment to other assignments such as security or clerical and menial work.

Duties

Apart from their military training, draftees also have other duties such as cleaning the camp, making food, serving other draftees in the military restaurants, et cetera. In the case of an emergency, draftees might be called upon for assistance in forest fires or other natural disasters.

Accommodation

Draftees live in barracks. Each barracks contains its own toilet facilities and sometimes its own canteen. The barracks are divided into dorms each providing accommodation for a varying number of draftees, depending on the military installation; this number can be as little as 3 draftees in remote outposts or as high as 75, such as the dorms of the Hellenic Air Force's 124 Basic Training Wing.

Leaves of absence
During their tour, conscripts are entitled to a total of 18 days leave of absence. Farmers and students serving in the armed forces may be excused from their duties for an additional 18 days (maximum). Parents are entitled to extra five days of leave per child.  Up to ten days of leave can be awarded for outstanding performance, at the commanding officer's discretion. Conscripts may be awarded leave for health reasons, performing hazardous duties, NGO work or other reasons. In addition, it is current practice to award two days of leave per month of service in front-line units, although there is no explicit provision for this in the conscription law. In practice, all these breaks are usually taken in small blocks rather than long holidays.

Financial repercussions
Conscripts are unsalaried, but nominal financial aid is provided, ranging from approximately 9 euro per month (for the vast majority of conscripts, who are soldiers) to 600 euro (for designate officers), depending on the conscripts' rank and family status. This aid is not technically considered a salary: it is intended to help draftees with various unforeseen expenses, which are not normally covered by the military (i.e. expenses other than food, accommodation, clothing, and some transport fees).

In 2004, the Greek Parliament passed a law stating that men over the age of 35 would be allowed to buy off their military obligation after attending 45 days of basic training. Currently the amount required to do this is 8,505 euro. This price tag (810 euro for every month not served) is calculated based on the income of professional soldiers adjusted for taxes. Therefore, it is considered as indirect taxation, on out-of-country and re-repatriated Greeks, as that amount is basically salary for an entire year in Greece.

Attitude towards conscription and conscripts (draftees)
The military has a strong part in Greek society and structure, and is generally regarded as one of the most trustworthy institutions in the country. Among more traditional sectors of society, such as those in rural regions, national service has been historically perceived as a rite of passage. Mandatory military service is often perceived as part of the "natural" order of life, and as a final school of socialization and maturing for young Greek men before the real world. This mindset is still present in modern times.   

However, in recent decades, military service has become unpopular among some segments of society, particularly many living in urban communities. Some draftees consider conscription a waste of time. There have also been incidents of conscripts being used for jobs outside their normal mandate, such as fighting forest fires (without protective equipment). Thus the Greek Ministry of Defense has stated that one out of three men eligible for conscription never showed up for their tour. Draft evaders living in Greece have risen to 30,000. The number of young men trying to achieve permanent deferment by stating (usually mental) health problems has also increased in recent years.

The average age of draftees is higher than in the past, where conscripts tended to be 18–20 years old. Nowadays, conscripts are commonly in their mid-twenties, and many have university-level education prior to conscription. In past generations, the army would often be the first time a young male adult would find himself on his own and away from home; nowadays this has by and large been replaced by Higher Education studies.

See also
 Loafing and Camouflage (Loufa kai Parallaghi Λούφα και παραλλαγή) by movie director Nikos Perakis

References

External links
 Basic Training (archived 4 January 2007)
 Conscription Guide (archived 4 January 2007)
 Conscription Law (3421/05) (PDF; archived 10 June 2006)
 Greek Ministry of Defence: Official Conscription site
 Greek Ministry of Defence: Special Topics: Conscription 
 OMHPOI/"Hostages": Greek advocacy website against conscription in Greece (archived 11 June 2017)

Greece
Military of Greece